Joseph Chartrand (May 11, 1870 – December 8, 1933) was an American prelate of the Catholic Church. He was the 6th Bishop of Indianapolis, serving from 1918 until his death in 1933.

Biography
Joseph Chartrand was born in St. Louis, Missouri, to Joseph and Margaret (née Sullivan) Chartrand. His father, who was also born in Missouri, was of French descent; his mother was a native of County Kerry in Ireland.

He studied at Saint Meinrad Seminary and 
was ordained to the priesthood on September 24, 1892 for the Diocese of Vincennes, which later became the Archdiocese of Indianapolis. He was made vicar general of Indianapolis on February 13, 1910.

On July 27, 1910, Chartrand was appointed Coadjutor Bishop of Indianapolis and Titular Bishop of Flavias by Pope Pius X. He received his episcopal consecration on the following September 15 from Archbishop Diomede Falconio, with Bishops Denis O'Donaghue and Herman Alerding serving as co-consecrators. Chartrand succeeded the late Francis Silas Chatard as the sixth Bishop of Indianapolis on September 7, 1918.

In May 1925, Chartrand was named Archbishop of Cincinnati and John McNicholas, Bishop of Duluth, Minnesota was named Bishop of Indianapolis.  For reasons that are unknown, Chartrand was able to convince Rome that he should not take that post, so in July 1925, the two men switched and McNicholas was named Archbishop of Cincinnati and Chartrand was reappointed to Indianapolis.

Chartrand was once described as an "able" bishop, and as "probably closer in contact with his flock than any other" bishop. He was also named an Assistant at the Pontifical Throne on February 4, 1928.

Bishop Chartrand died in Indianapolis, at the age of 63. He was initially buried in the crypt of Saints Peter and Paul Cathedral, but his remains were later transferred to the Calvary Chapel Mausoleum on June 8, 1976.

References

External links
John T. McNicholas Biography
Archdiocese of Indianapolis - Bishops and Archbishops of the Archdiocese
Catholic-Hierarchy

1870 births
1933 deaths
20th-century Roman Catholic bishops in the United States
Roman Catholic bishops of Indianapolis
Burials in Indiana
Clergy from St. Louis
American people of French descent
American Roman Catholic clergy of Irish descent